Duryu Park, founded in 1965, is a park located in Duryu-dong, Daegu Dalseo-gu, South Korea.

The area of the park is 1,653,965 m². It is equipped with many facilities such as multipurpose playgrounds, a swimming pool, tennis courts, a roller skating rink, a football field, and a baseball field. There are two small Buddhist temples on the grounds and the Cathedral Pond - Osaek Fountain. The park is popular for its scenic bridge and views during autumn and spring, during which cherry blossoms bloom. Some festivals and concerts are also held on the grounds, such as a body-painting and a flying lantern festival.

There are over 133 species of trees and plants in the park.

References

  
http://100.naver.com/100.nhn?docid=741842

Parks in Daegu
Dalseo District
Sports venues in Daegu
1965 establishments in South Korea
20th-century architecture in South Korea